Scotch and soda is a cocktail of Scotch whisky and carbonated water.

Scotch and soda or Scotch and Soda may also refer to:
 Scotch and soda (magic trick), a magic trick
 Scotch & Soda (clothing), a Dutch fashion brand
 "Scotch and Soda" (song), a song by The Kingston Trio